Henry Ford (February 11, 1825June 20, 1894) was a Michigan politician.

Early life
Ford was born on February 11, 1825, in Monroe, New York.

Career
Ford moved to Michigan in 1867 to oversee the erection of the Lawton Iron Works. From 1868 to 1869, Ford served as village president of Lawton, Michigan. He served as village president again in 1879. On November 2, 1880, Ford was elected to the Michigan Senate where he represented the 12th district from January 1, 1881, to December 31, 1882. Ford had also served as justice of the peace.

Personal life
At some point in his life, Ford married a woman named Catherine. Together they had two children. Ford married Florence A. Smith on January 18, 1882, in Lawton.

Death
Ford died on June 20, 1894, of heart failure.

References

1825 births
1894 deaths
American justices of the peace
Deaths from organ failure
Republican Party Michigan state senators
People from Monroe, New York
People from Van Buren County, Michigan
19th-century American judges
19th-century American politicians